Festuca brevipila, the hard fescue, is a species of grass which can be found everywhere in Canada and in both Eastern and Central United States (except for Arkansas, Kansas, Nebraska, Oklahoma, and South Dakota).

The species derives its common name by virtue of being the "hardiest" of the fescue family. It does well in poor soils and is "very drought tolerant" preferring deep and infrequent watering.

This grass is used for residential and sports turf, and erosion control.

References

brevipila
Flora of North America